Limbo is a 2023 Australian independent mystery-crime film directed by Ivan Sen and starring Simon Baker, Rob Collins, Natasha Wanganeen and Nicholas Hope. The film, produced by Bunya Productions and Windalong Films with the support of Screen Queensland and South Australian Film Corporation,  had its world premiere in competition at the 73rd Berlin International Film Festival, on 23 February 2023, where it competed for Golden Bear.

Synopsis
In a small Australian outback town Travis Hurley, a detective, comes to investigate a 20-year-old unsolved homicide of an Aboriginal woman. Travis discovers a collection of unpleasant truths, highlighting the intricacies of loss and injustice faced by Aboriginal Australians.

Cast
 Simon Baker as Travis Hurley
 Rob Collins
 Natasha Wanganeen
 Nicholas Hope
 Mark Coe

Production
Filming began on 19 August 2022 at Coober Pedy in South Australia. The production is supported by Screen Queensland’s Screen Finance program, the ABC, Windalong Films, and the South Australian Film Corporation.

Release
The film had its World premiere at the 73rd Berlin International Film Festival on 23 February 2023.

Reception

On the review aggregator Rotten Tomatoes website, the film has an approval rating of 100% based on 6 reviews, with an average rating of 7.5/10. On Metacritic, it has a weighted average score of 80 out of 100 based on 4 reviews, indicating "Generally Favorable Reviews".

Peter Bradshaw of The Guardian rated the film with 4 stars out of 5 and wrote, "It is a tough, muscular film with the grit of crime, but a heartbeat of compassion." David Rooney for The Hollywood Reporter stating that the film is "A riveting, multilayered genre piece", concluded writing, "With its strikingly cinematic locations and Sen’s expressive use of the widescreen frame, Limbo also sneaks up on you, leaving a haunting impression." Guy Lodge reviewing at Berlin Film Festival, for Variety wrote, "This is outback noir — oblique, secretive and as hard-boiled as the ground is hard-baked — and Sen wears it well." Wendy Ide for ScreenDaily wrote in review that the film is "a distinctive work, both visually – the stark black and white photography accentuates the uncanny, almost lunar pockmarks on this scarred terrain – and in terms of its intriguingly detached outback noir storytelling."

Accolades

References

External links 
 
 
 Limbo at Berlinale
 

2023 films
Films directed by Ivan Sen
2020s English-language films
2020s Australian films
Australian crime films
Screen Australia films
Films shot in South Australia
Australian mystery films
2023 crime drama films